GSP TV (initially named Antena 5, then named GSP TV to promote the newspaper Gazeta Sporturilor) was a private commercial television channel from Romania, focused on sports shows. It was launched on July 26, 2008, owned by Antena TV Group. From September 14, 2012 GSP TV became a station for men. 
Starting on April 3, 2014 at 09:00, the television station changed its name to ZU TV.

Shows
Meciul zilei (Match of the Day)– a talk-show about sports hosted daily by Viorel Grigoroiu
Contraatac– a talk-show about sports hosted daily by Dan Udrea
Radio GSP
Fight News Extra
This is IT – a talk-show about IT hosted daily by Costin Deşliu
Smile cu Cătălin Oprișan
FootbALL Inclusive
Ginx TV
Sport Cafe

Competitions

Football
Liga I
EFL Championship
MLS

Fights
UFC
RXF

Billiard
Mosconi Cup

External links
GSP TV News

Television channels and stations established in 2008
Television stations in Romania